The 1995–96 Elitserien season was the 21st season of the Elitserien, the top level of ice hockey in Sweden. 12 teams participated in the league, and Luleå HF won the championship.

Standings

First round

Final round

Playoffs

External links
 Swedish Hockey League official site

Swe
1995–96 in Swedish ice hockey
Swedish Hockey League seasons